The 1944 Villanova Wildcats football team represented the Villanova University during the 1944 college football season. The head coach was Jordan Olivar, coaching his second season with the Wildcats. The team played their home games at Villanova Stadium in Villanova, Pennsylvania.

Schedule

References

Villanova
Villanova Wildcats football seasons
Villanova Wildcats football